Unorganized Thunder Bay District is an unorganized area in northwestern Ontario, Canada in Thunder Bay District. It comprises all parts of the district that are not part of an incorporated municipality or a First Nations reserve.

Most of the territory is within the Eastern Time Zone, but the part west of the 90th meridian is in the Central Time Zone.

Geography

Communities with Local services board 
Armstrong
East Gorham
Hurkett
Kaministiquia
Lappe
Rossport
Shebandowan

Other communities

Auden
Burchell Lake
Collins
English River (on boundary with Kenora District)
Finmark
Flindt Landing
Harvey
Hemlo
Heron Bay
Kashabowie
Melgund
Nolalu
Ombabika
Pays Plat
Raith
Savant Lake
Shabaqua
Shabaqua Corners
Silver Islet
Silver Mountain
Staunton
Sorrell Lake
Suomi
Upsala

History
Gold was noted in the area since 1869, but it wasn't until Peter Moses from Heron Bay, Ontario discovered additional gold that prospectors flocked to the area. In 1947, Dr. J. Williams and Moses staked 11 claims, which became the Lake Superior Mining Corporation. However, not much development took place until 1979, when Don and David McKinnon, along with John Larche, staked claims in Hemlo and the Manitouwadge area. The Williams Mine started operation in 1985, and produced 445,320 ounces of gold from a 2.45 meter wide ore body. The Golden Giant Mine produced 446,858 ounces in 1994 from a quartz sericite schist host rock. The David Bell Mines produced 204,251 ounces in 1994. The Hemlo gold mines had produced more than 6,000,000 ounces of gold by 1992.

Demographics

Population trend:
 Population in 2011: 5909
 Population in 2006: 6585
 Population in 2001: 6223
 Population in 1996: 8460 (or 6534 when adjusted to 2001 boundaries)
 Land area: 
 Population in 1991: 8168

Parks in Unorganized Thunder Bay
Provincial parks in Unorganized Thunder Bay include:
 Albany River Provincial Park
 Kopka River Provincial Park
 Neys Provincial Park
 Rainbow Falls Provincial Park
 Sleeping Giant Provincial Park
 Steel River Provincial Park
 Wabakimi Provincial Park

It is also home to one National Park of Canada: Pukaskwa National Park.

See also
List of townships in Ontario
Matachewan, Ontario
Cobalt silver rush
Porcupine Gold Rush
Red Lake, Ontario
Greenstone, Ontario

References

External links 

Geography of Thunder Bay District
Thunder Bay
Populated places on Lake Superior in Canada